Edwin James Milliken  (1839 in Ireland – 26 August 1897), was a Punch editor, journalist, satirical humorist and poet. He is best known for his oft-quoted poem "Death and his brother sleep", notably quoted by Winston Churchill in the prelude to World War II when he felt that parliament was not taking the prospect of a war against Hitler seriously enough. He produced a series of comic poems published as The 'Arry Papers between 1874 and 1897. He worked as journalist on the London Figaro in 1872 and joined Punch in 1877. His creation of 'Arry, a bombastic Cockney, resulted in a successful series of poems which were hailed for their phonetic precision. Milliken described 'Arry as "really appalling. He is not a creature to be laughed at or with." In 1883 he published The Modern Ars Amandi.

Milliken's first association with Punch occurred on 2 January 1875 with a few lines entitled "A Voice from Venus", that planet's transit having just taken place. This was his first contribution and, since he was a newcomer, he was asked for an assurance that he was indeed the author. From then on his contributions were regular and he was welcomed to the staff in early 1877.

Milliken was trained for, and spent the beginning of his career, with a large engineering firm. The literary world, though, was always his first love and his contributions to a few magazines and journals initially satisfied this bent. His first accredited work was a memorial poem to Charles Dickens printed in The Gentleman's Magazine in 1870.

He died on 26 August 1897 and was buried at West Norwood Cemetery.

Major contributions to Punch
"Childe Chappie's Pilgrimage" (1883) Edwin James Milliken, illustrated by Edward J. Wheeler (1848–1933)
"The Modern Ars Amandi" (1883)
"The Town" (1884)
"Fitzdotterel; or, T'other and Which" (parody of Lord Lytton's "Glenaveril") (1885)
"Modern Asmodeus" (1889–90)
"The New Guide to Knowledge"

External links
The 'Arry ballads: an annotated collection of the verse letters by Punch – Edwin James Milliken, Patricia Marks
A Man of the Crowd to Charles Dickens
Green’s Heroes of Slang

References

Irish poets
Irish humorists
1839 births
1897 deaths
English magazine editors
Burials at West Norwood Cemetery
19th-century journalists
English male journalists
19th-century poets
Irish male poets
19th-century English male writers